The Odisha Hydro Power Corporation or OHPC is a Public Sector Undertaking of Government of Odisha which was incorporated under the Companies Act 1956 on 21 April 1995 with the objective of establishing, operating, maintaining, renovating & modernizing hydro, thermal and other forms of power generating station besides owning, developing and operating coal mines for supply of fuel to the thermal power stations.

Power stations
 Hirakud Hydro Electric Project (Burla)	
 Chiplima Hydro Electric Project (Chiplima)	
 Balimela Hydro Electric Project (Balimela)
 Rengali Hydro Electric Project (Rengali)	
 Upper Kolab Hydro Electric Project (Bariniput)
 Upper Indravati Hydro Electric Project (Mukhiguda)
 Machkund Hydro Electric Project, Onukudeli

Projects under construction or approved
 Potteru Small Hydro Electric Project	
 Sindol Complex (Deogaon, Kapasira, Godhaneswar)	
 Middle Kolab Hydro Electric Project	
 Tel Integrated Project	
 Lower Vansadhara Project	
 Balijori Hydro Electric Project or Bhimkund & Baigundi Cascading Project	
 Salki Hydro Electric Project	
 Khadago Dam Project	
 Uttel & Roul Integrated Project	
 Mahanadi-Brahmani River Link	
 Barmul Hydro Electric Project	
 Pumped Storage Scheme	
 Small Hydro Electric Project	 	
 Jambira Dam Toe 	
 Kanpur Dam Toe

References

External links
Official Website of Odisha Hydro Power Corporation (OHPC)

Economy of Odisha
Electric-generation companies of India
State agencies of Odisha
Energy in Odisha
1995 establishments in Orissa
Indian companies established in 1995